Fiona Dorothy Pardington  (born 1961) is a New Zealand artist, her principal medium being photography.

Early life and education
Pardington was born Fiona Dorothy Cameron in Devonport, and was brought up on Auckland's Hibiscus Coast, where she attended Orewa College. She descends from three Māori iwi, (Ngāi Tahu, Kāti Māmoe and Ngāti Kahungunu), and the Scottish Clan Cameron of Erracht. Knowing that she wanted to become a photographer from the age of six, Pardington studied photography at Elam School of Fine Arts, University of Auckland graduating with a Bachelor of Fine Arts in 1984.

In 2003, Pardington graduated from Elam School of Fine Arts with a Master of Fine Arts (First Class Honours) and in 2013 graduated with a Doctor of Fine Arts in photography with a doctoral thesis titled Towards a Kaupapa of Ancestral Power and Talk. She has throughout her career held the positions as a lecturer, tutor, assessor and moderator on photography, design and fine arts programmes at universities and polytechnics throughout New Zealand.

Pardington's brother Neil Pardington (11 months her junior) is also a well-known photographer and book designer.

Career, themes and style
Early in her career, Pardington worked from a feminist viewpoint to explore themes of love and sex, the representation and perception of the body, and the construction of gender and identity. She specialised in 'pure' or analogue darkroom techniques, most notably hand printing and toning.

In the 1980s, borrowing from early, highly romanticized pictorialist photography, Pardington challenged the social construction of the eternal feminine by making theatrical photographs of the female nude.

In 1990 Pardington won the prestigious Moet et Chandon New Zealand Art Foundation Fellowship. She won the Visa Gold Art Award in 1991 for Soft Target, a work framed with beaten, studded copper and gold-painted wood, that is encrusted with contradictory religious images and texts.

Pardington was the recipient of the Frances Hodgkins Fellowship at the University of Otago in both 1996 and 1997. In 1997 Pardington won the Visa Gold Art Award for a second time with Taniwha, 1996, a close up of a bar of soap, a colonial relic with an appropriated Māori name.

In 2001 Pardington was the Auckland Unitec Institute of Technology Artist in Residence and began a body of work examining extant collections of cultural objects or taonga (treasures) in New Zealand's museums.

In 2005 the New Zealand Government gifted the Quai Branly Suite of Nine Hei tiki to the people of France. Pardington is one of two Māori artists represented by the Musee du Quai Branly.

In 2006 Pardington was the Ngāi Tahu artist in residence at the Otago Polytechnic, during which time she studied and photographed nests from the Otago Museum collection.

In 2010 Pardington completed a Laureate Artistic Creations Project with the Musée du Quai Branly, photographing more than fifty casts of Māori, Pacific and European heads, including casts of her Ngāi Tahu ancestors, held in the Musée Flaubert et d’Histoire de la Medecine in Rouen, Muséum National d'Histoire Naturelle in Paris and in the Auckland War Memorial Museum. The casts made in the Pacific region during Dumont d’Urville’s last exploratory voyage of 1837–40 by the phrenologist Pierre-Marie Alexandre Dumoutier (1791–1871) included three tattooed warriors: Tangatahara and Piuraki (who are Ngāi Tahu) and Matua Tawai (from Kororareka). Originally exhibited in vitrines outside the Musée du Quai Branly in Paris, Ahua: A beautiful hesitation, was selected to be exhibited at the 17th Biennale of Sydney in May 2010, and was allocated a dedicated gallery space in the Museum of Contemporary Art Australia. The series is illustrated in The Pressure of Sunlight Falling, published by Otago University Press and was exhibited at the Govett-Brewster Art Gallery, New Plymouth and Dunedin Public Art Gallery in 2011.

Pardington's work Ake Ake Huia, holds the auction record for a single New Zealand photograph having sold in 2010 for NZ$30,385. Pardington's major work, the Quai Branly Suite of Nine Hei Tiki, holds the auction record for a New Zealand photographic work having sold in 2010 for NZ$64,278. This was one of only two complete sets made by the artist with the other set having been gifted to the people of France by the New Zealand government.

Pardington's still-life imagery made in 2012 and 2013 have a painterly quality that visually reference seventeenth-century painting traditions as well as the 16th-century vanitas traditions. The images are not only memento mori in the provision of poetic signs of time passing and things dying – from dandelion clocks to gecko skins – but of cultures meeting across seas.

In 2013 Pardington completed a three-month artist's residency at the Colin McCahon House in Titirangi, Auckland.

A major survey of Pardington's work, Fiona Pardington: A Beautiful Hesitation, featuring more than 100 photographs, was held at City Gallery Wellington in August – November 2015. The exhibition travelled to Auckland Art Gallery in 2016.

In February 2016 it was announced that Pardington had been selected by curator Fumio Nanjo for the first Honolulu Biennale, to be held in 2017.

Fellowships, residencies and awards 
 1991 Visa Gold Art Award
 1991 Moet & Chandon Fellow, France
 1996 Frances Hodgkins Fellow
 1997 Visa Gold Art Award
 2001 Auckland Unitec Artist in Residence
 2006 Ngāi Tahu residency at Otago Polytechnic
 2010 Laureate Artistic Creations Project with the Musee du Quai Branly, France
 2011 Arts Foundation Laureate Award recipient
 2013 Colin McCahon House Artists’ Residency
 2016 Chevalier Ordre des Arts et des Lettres
 2017 Appointed a Member of the New Zealand Order of Merit in the Queen's Birthday Honours, for services to photography.

Notable exhibitions 

Solo exhibitions
2015–2016 Fiona Pardington: A Beautiful Hesitation, City Gallery Wellington, Auckland Art Gallery, Christchurch Art Gallery Te Puna o Waiwhetu
 2011 The Pressure of Sunlight Falling, Govett-Brewster Art Gallery and Dunedin Public Art Gallery
2001 One Night of Love, Waikato Museum of Art and History

Group exhibitions
2013 Among the Machines: Australian and New Zealand Artists, Dunedin Public Art Gallery
 2012 Contact, Frankfurter Kunstverein, Germany
 2012 Arsenale, Kyiv International Biennale of Contemporary Art, Ukraine
2011 Tender is the night, City Gallery Wellington
 2010 17th Biennale of Sydney
 2010 Unnerved: The New Zealand Project, Queensland Art Gallery and National Gallery of Victoria
 2009 Photographer Unknown, Monash University Museum of Art
 2009 Brought to Light, Christchurch Art Gallery Te Puna o Waiwhetu
 2007 Photoquai, Musée du Quai Branly
 2006 Mo Tatou: The Ngāi Tahu Whanui exhibition, Museum of New Zealand Te Papa Tongarewa
2003 Te Puāwai o Ngāi Tahu: Twelve contemporary Ngāi Tahu artists, Christchurch Art Gallery
1996 Cultural Safety, City Gallery Wellington and Frankfurter Kunstverein
1993 Alter / Image, City Gallery Wellington

Publications
Stuart McKenzie, Rising to the Blow, Épernay, France : Moet et Chandon, 1992. 
Kyla Macfarlane, One Night of Lovee, Hamilton: Waikato Museum of Art & History, 2001. 
Gina Irish, The Heart Derelict, Dunedin: Otago Polytechnic, 2006. 
Fiona Pardington, Journey of the Sensualist, Whanganui: McNamara Gallery, 2008. 
Roger Boyce, Eros & Agape, Wellington: Suite Gallery, 2010.
Andrew Paul Wood, Blood & Roses, Christchurch: Jonathan Smart Gallery, 2011. 
Andrew Paul Wood, Mushrooms : the champignons Barla, Christchurch: A.P. Wood Publishing, 2011. 
Kriselle Baker and Elizabeth Rankin, Fiona Pardington : the pressure of sunlight falling, Dunedin: Otago University Press, 2011. 
 Aaron Lister et al., Fiona Pardington: A Beautiful Hesitation, Wellington: Victoria University Press, 2015.

Public collections 
 Musée du Quai Branly
 National Gallery of Canada, Ottawa, Canada
 National Gallery of Art, Washington DC, USA
 Queensland Art Gallery/Gallery of Modern Art
 National Gallery of Victoria
 Te Papa
 Auckland Art Gallery
 Christchurch Art Gallery
 Govett-Brewster Art Gallery
Dunedin Public Art Gallery
 University of Auckland Art Collection, Auckland, New Zealand
 Victoria University of Wellington Art Collection, Wellington, New Zealand
 Chartwell Collection, Auckland, New Zealand

Further reading
Interview with Fiona Pardington, Standing Room Only, Radio New Zealand National, 16 August 2015
Robert Leonard, Love not given lightly, October 2015
Pip Adam, A Beautiful Hesitation: An Interview with Aaron Lister, Pantograph Punch, March 2016 
Kriselle Baker, Venous Flow: Psychic and Somatic Pain in the Work of Fiona Pardington, Pantograph Punch, March 2016 
Anthony Byrt, AAF Hot Pick: Fiona Pardington’s A Beautiful Hesitation , Metro, March 2016
Andrew Paul Wood, Fiona Pardington | 100% Unicorn, Starkwhite, June 2016

References

External links
View examples of Fiona Pardington's work
Fiona Pardington's website

1961 births
Living people
New Zealand photographers
New Zealand women photographers
People from North Shore, New Zealand
Ngāi Tahu people
Kāti Māmoe people
Ngāti Kahungunu people
New Zealand people of Scottish descent
Elam Art School alumni
New Zealand Māori artists
Chevaliers of the Ordre des Arts et des Lettres
Members of the New Zealand Order of Merit
People educated at Orewa College
Photographers from Auckland